Cash: The Autobiography is a 1997 autobiography of Johnny Cash, country musician, written twenty years after his first autobiography, Man in Black. Cash co-wrote this book with Patrick Carr. Cash's autobiographies were the basis for the biopic Walk the Line in 2005.

First edition
San Francisco: Harper San Francisco.

Reviews
 Kirkus Reviews, October 1, 1997.

 

1997 non-fiction books
Autobiographies adapted into films
Johnny Cash
Music autobiographies
Harper San Francisco books